This is a list of the top-level leaders for religious groups with at least 50,000 adherents, and that led anytime from January 1, 1001, to December 31, 1100. It should likewise only name leaders listed on other articles and lists.

Christianity
Church of Rome (complete list) –
Sylvester II, Pope (999–1003)
John XVII, Pope (1003)
John XVIII, Pope (1003–1009)
Sergius IV, Pope (1009–1012)
Benedict VIII, Pope (1012–1024)
John XIX, Pope (1024–1032)
Benedict IX, Pope (1032–1044, 1045, 1047–1048)
Sylvester III, Pope (1056–1062)
Benedict IX, Pope (1032–1044, 1045, 1047–1048)
Gregory VI, Pope (1045–1046)
Clement II, Pope (1046–1047)
Benedict IX, Pope (1032–1044, 1045, 1047–1048)
Damasus II, Pope (1048)
Leo IX, Pope (1049–1054)
Victor II, Pope (1055–1057)
Stephen IX, Pope (1057–1058)
Nicholas II, Pope (1059–1061)
Alexander II, Pope (1061–1073)
Gregory VII, Pope (1073–1085)
Victor III, Pope (1086–1087)
Urban II, Pope (1088–1099)
Paschal II, Pope (1099–1118)

Church of Constantinople (complete list) –
Sergius II, Patriarch (1001–1019)
Eustathius, Patriarch (1019–1025)
Alexius I the Studite, Patriarch (1025–1043)
Michael I Cerularius, Patriarch (1043–1058)
The first among equals in Eastern Orthodoxy after the East–West Schism of 1054
Constantine III Leichoudes, Ecumenical Patriarch (1059–1063)
John VIII Xiphilinos, Ecumenical Patriarch (1064–1075)
Kosmas I, Ecumenical Patriarch (1075–1081)
Eustratius Garidas, Ecumenical Patriarch (1081–1084)
Nicholas III Grammaticus, Ecumenical Patriarch (1084–1111)

Islam

Sunni

Abbasids, Baghdad (complete list) –
al-Qadir, Caliph (991–1031)
al-Qa'im, Caliph (1031–1075)
al-Muqtadi, Caliph (1075–1094)
al-Mustazhir, Caliph (1094–1118)

Islamic Spain (complete list) –
Hisham II, (976–1008, 1010–1012)
Muhammad II, (1008–1009)
Sulayman ibn al-Hakam, (1009–1010, 1012–1017)
Abd ar-Rahman IV, (1021–1022)
Abd ar-Rahman V, (1022–1023)
Muhammad III, (1023–1024)
Hisham III, (1027–1031)

Shia
Twelver Islam
Imams (complete list) –
Muhammad al-Mahdi, Imam (874–present) Shia belief holds that he was hidden by Allah in 874.
Marja
Al-Sharif al-Radi(993-1015)
Shaykh Mufid(1005-1025)
Sayyid Murtadhā,Alam al Huda(1025-1044)
Shaykh Tusi(1044-1068)
Ibn Barraj(1068-1088)
Ibn-e-Haddād(1085-1097)

Isma'ili Islam (complete list) –
al-Hakim bi-Amr Allah, Caliph and Imam (996–1021)
ali az-Zahir, Caliph and Imam (1021–1036)
al-Mustansir Billah, Caliph and Imam (1036–1094)
The succession was disputed after al-Mustansir Billah's death, leading to a schism which created the Nizari branch
Musta'li line
al-Musta'li, Caliph and Imam (1094–1101)
Nizari line (complete list) –
Nizar, Imam (1094–1095)
Ali al-Hadi, Imam (1095–?) in occultation
De facto leader: Hassan-i Sabbah, da'i (1095–1124)

Zaidiyyah (complete list) –
al-Mansur al-Qasim al-Iyyani, Imam (999–1002)
ad-Da'i Yusuf, Imam (1002–1012)
al-Mahdi al-Husayn, Imam (1003–1013)
al-Mu'ayyad Ahmad, Imam (1013–1020)
Abu Talib Yahya, Imam (1020–1033)
al-Mu’id li-Din Illah, Imam (1027–1030)
Abu Hashim al-Hasan, Imam (1031–1040)
Abu'l-Fath an-Nasir ad-Dailami, Imam (1038–1053)
al-Muhtasib al-Mujahid Hamzah, Imam (1060–1067)

Judaism

Karaite Judaism

Exilarch (complete list) –
Solomon ben David (late 10th–early 11th centuries)
Hezekiah ben Solomon (11th century)
Hasdai ben Hezekiah (11th–12th centuries)

Talmudic Academies in Mesopotamia

Pumbedita Academy (complete list) –
Sherira Gaon, Gaon (968–1006)
Hai Gaon, Gaon (1004–1038)
Hezekiah Gaon, Gaon and Exilarch (1038–1040)

Sura Academy (complete list) –
Samuel ben Hofni, Gaon (c.998–c.1012)
Dosa ben Saadia Gaon, Gaon (1012–1018)
Israel ha-Kohen ben Samuel ben Hofni, Gaon (1018–1033)

See also

Religious leaders by year

External links
 http://www.rulers.org/relig.html

11th century
 
Religious leaders